The 1996 British Formula Three season was the 46th British Formula Three Championship. The season started on 31 March at Silverstone and ended there on 13 October following sixteen races. After losing out in the final reckoning to Oliver Gavin in 1995, Ralph Firman was able to clinch the crown on his second attempt from Kurt Mollekens and teammate Jonny Kane. New Zealander Simon Wills took the Class B title.

Drivers and Teams

Race calendar and results

 Round 11 was shortened due to heavy rain, and a planned second race at Snetterton was also cancelled.

Championship

Class A

Class B

References
AUTOCOURSE 1996-97British Motorsport Year 1996-97

External links
 The official website of the British Formula 3 Championship

Formula Three
British Formula Three Championship seasons
British Formula 3